Morten Stig Christensen (born 27 December 1958 in Hjørring) is a Danish television presenter and former handball player.

In 1976 he was a squad member of the Danish team which finished eighth in the Olympic tournament. He was a reserve player and did not play in a match.

Four years later he finished ninth with the Danish team in the 1980 Olympic tournament. He played four matches and scored two goals.

In 1984 he was part of the Danish team which finished fourth in the Olympic tournament. He played all six matches and scored 14 goals.

After his handball career finished, he did some acting, he appeared in a film in 1986 Friends Forever as 'Mads' and in 2006, in one episode of Anna Pihl (TV Series) as 'Nyhedsvært'.
He then carried out a lot of left-wing political work. Since then he has become more moderate.

Currently Morten Stig Christensen works in the Danish TV channel TV 2 presenting programs, most commonly about sports. He is the boss in TV 2 Sporten (the sports section on TV 2).

References

External links
 profile  
 TV2 profile 

1958 births
Living people
Danish male handball players
Danish male actors
Danish television presenters
Olympic handball players of Denmark
Handball players at the 1976 Summer Olympics
Handball players at the 1980 Summer Olympics
Handball players at the 1984 Summer Olympics
People from Hjørring
Sportspeople from the North Jutland Region